John Henry Blunt (25 August 1823 in Chelsea – 11 April 1884 in London) was an English divine.

Life
Before going to the University College, Durham in 1850, he was for some years engaged in business as a manufacturing chemist. He was ordained in 1852 and took his M.A. degree in 1855, publishing in the same year a work on The Atonement. He held in succession several preferments, among them the vicarage of Kennington near Oxford (1868), which he vacated in 1873 for the crown living of Beverston in Gloucestershire.

In June 1882, his university made him a doctor of divinity. He died rather suddenly in London on 11 April 1884 (Good Friday), and was buried in Battersea cemetery.

Works
He became a voluminous writer in the fields of theology and ecclesiastical history, and had published among other works an annotated edition of the Prayer Book (1867), a History of the English Reformation (1868), a Book of Church Law (1872), as well as a Dictionary of Doctrinal and Historical Theology (1870). The continuation of these labors was seen in a Dictionary of Sects and Heresies (1874), an Annotated Bible (3 vols., 1878–1879), and a Cyclopaedia of Religion (1884).
 Dictionary of Sects, Heresies, Ecclesiastical Parties, and Schools of Religious Thought. Rivingtons, 1903.

References

Attribution

External links
 
 
 

1823 births
1884 deaths
People from Chelsea, London
English theologians
19th-century English Anglican priests
Alumni of University College, Durham
English male non-fiction writers

19th-century Anglican theologians